Aru (also Romanized as Ārū and Arow) is a village in Poshtkuh Rural District, in the Central District of Firuzkuh County, Tehran Province, Iran. The village coordinates can be found geographically at 35° 40' 5" North, 52° 26' 24" East. Within the 2006 census, its population was 77 people, consisting of 22 families.

References 

Populated places in Firuzkuh County